Covendo is a village in the La Paz Department of Bolivia. It is in the valley of the upper Beni River (Alto Beni) in the Bolivian Andes.

In 2001 it had a population of 517.

It is served by Covendo Airport.

References

Populated places in La Paz Department (Bolivia)